Dueñas is a municipality in the province of Palencia, Castile and León, Spain.

References

Municipalities in the Province of Palencia